The Ancient Port of Jaffa is a 1912 American silent documentary produced by Kalem Company and distributed by General Film Company. It was directed by Sidney Olcott.

Plot summary 
The picture opens with a scene of a steamship, showing the Kalem players ready to depart for the ancient port of Jaffa, referred to in the Bible as Joppa. A successful landing is made after navigating the dangerous, rocky passage. A splendid view of Jaffa from the sea greets our eyes and. going ashore, we marvel at the wonderful street scene near the Custom House. We journey on to the auction market and then visit the public fountain on the Jaffa road.

Cast 

 J.J. Clark
 Gene Gauntier
 George K. Hollister
 Sidney Olcott
 J.A. Farnham
 Alice Hollister
 J.P. McGowan
 Robert G. Vignola

Production notes
The documentary was shot in Jaffa, Palestine.

References

External links

 The Ancient Port of Jaffa website dedicated to Sidney Olcott

1912 films
American silent short films
American black-and-white films
Films directed by Sidney Olcott
American documentary films
1912 documentary films
Jaffa
Films shot in Palestine (region)
1910s American films
1910s English-language films